Molek FM, stylised as molek fm is a Malaysian private radio station operated by Media Prima Audio, a radio subsidiary of Malaysian media conglomerate, Media Prima Berhad, serving the East Coast areas of Peninsular Malaysia. It operates 24 hours daily from the company's Sri Pentas headquarters in Petaling Jaya, Selangor. It is targeted to listeners aged 18 to 39, as well as East Coast peninsular listeners aged 24 to 34.

History 
Prior to the station's launch, the East Coast peninsular region only had two Malay radio networks catering such audience: Manis FM owned by the Terengganu state government, and Gegar owned by Media Prima's commercial rival Astro Radio.

Molek FM began test transmission on 2 January 2022 and began official broadcasts a week later, on 9 January. Molek FM plays songs from the 80s and 90s, as well as Malay, Hindi, Indonesian, English and Thai hits that cater the East Coast peninsular audience.

On 31 May 2022, Molek FM was awarded the "Excellence In Media Communication" trophy for the radio category through the Kelantan Entrepreneurship Business Awards 2022 which took place in Kota Bharu, Kelantan.

On 2 October 2022, Molek FM began broadcasting in Kuantan, Pahang through the frequency of 100.4 MHz which transmitted from Bukit Pelindung to replace the Chinese language radio station slot under Media Prima Audio which is 8FM (formerly One FM).

Notable announcers 
 Fizie Roslan
 Mek Zura 
 Mat Dan
 Kai Hassan
 Nazrin Nordin

Frequency

See also 
 Manis FM owned by Husa Network, established in 1998.
 Gegar (formerly THR Gegar) owned by Astro Radio, established in 2005 through the acquisition of Time Highway Radio (THR).

References

External links 
 

Radio stations in Malaysia
Radio stations established in 2022
2022 establishments in Malaysia
Malay-language radio stations